Maytime is a 1923 American silent romantic drama film directed by Louis J. Gasnier and starring Ethel Shannon, Harrison Ford, and William Norris. The film also features one of Clara Bow's earliest cinema roles. The film is based on the musical of the same name composed by Sigmund Romberg with a book by Rida Johnson Young. A different film with the same name was made in 1937 also based on the musical.

Plot
Ottilie Van Zandt is forced to wed her cousin, despite her love for Richard Wayne, the gardener's son. Richard leaves, vowing to return a wealthy man and eligible suitor for her. He returns to find she has already married and, in turn, marries another girl on impulse. Two generations later, the grandchildren of Ottilie and Richard, who both have inherited their names as well, meet and develop a close friendship that culminates in the romance that their grandparents began but could not consummate years before.

Cast

Preservation

Once considered to be a lost film, an incomplete print of the film was found in 2009 in the New Zealand Film Archive and underwent restoration. Four out the original seven reels had survived. The preserved film is available for viewing on the website of the National Film Preservation Foundation. The movie is in the public domain.

References

External links

Full Movie on National Film Preservation Foundation

Lantern slide plate

1923 films
1923 romantic drama films
American romantic drama films
American silent feature films
Films directed by Louis J. Gasnier
American black-and-white films
Films based on operettas
1920s rediscovered films
Rediscovered American films
Preferred Pictures films
Silent romantic drama films
1920s American films
Silent American drama films